MS Zenobia was a Swedish-built Challenger-class RO-RO ferry launched in 1979 that capsized and sank in the Mediterranean Sea, close to Larnaca, Cyprus, in June 1980 on her maiden voyage.

History
Zenobia was built at the Kockums Varv AB shipyard in Sweden and was delivered to her owners Rederi AB Nordö in late 1979. She left Malmö, Sweden on her maiden voyage, bound for Tartous, Syria on 4 May 1980, loaded with 104 tractor-trailers with cargo destined for the Mediterranean and the Middle East. She passed through the Strait of Gibraltar on 22 May 1980, stopping first at Heraklion, Crete and then to Piraeus, Athens, Greece. On the way to Athens the captain noticed steering problems and Zenobia began listing
to port. Following checks, it was determined the list was caused by excess water that had been pumped into the ballast tanks; this water was pumped out and she then departed for her second to last stop at Larnaca, Cyprus before reaching Syria.

She arrived at Larnaca on 2 June 1980, where the ballast problem had reoccurred, engineers discovered that the computerized pumping system was pumping excess water into the side ballast tanks due to a software error, making the list progressively worse. On 4 June, Zenobia was towed out of Larnaca harbor to prevent her becoming an obstruction should the worst happen and was left at anchor roughly 1–1.5 miles (1.5–2 km) offshore. On 5 June, with the ship listing at around 45° the captain dismissed the engineers and maintenance crew and requests from the captain to return her to Larnaca harbor were denied.

There were no casualties in the disaster.

A Discovery Channel documentary investigated the theory whether Zenobia was sabotaged by Mossad and MI6.

Of her two sister ships,  is still operational as of January 2021;  was scrapped in October 2011.

Wreck diving
The wreck is consistently ranked as one of the top 10 recreational dive sites worldwide. As a dive site, Zenobia provides a wide range of challenges to scuba divers, from a fairly simple dive to  depth along the starboard side of the ship (suitable for newly qualified divers); moving up to a more advanced dive inside the upper car deck and accommodation block, right up to extremely adventurous dives within the lower car deck or the engine room (which are only suitable for very experienced divers).

References

External links

 Gallery 
 Scuba diving

Shipwrecks
Ships of Sweden
Shipwrecks in the Mediterranean Sea
Maritime incidents in 1980
Wreck diving sites
1979 ships
Ships sunk with no fatalities
Underwater diving sites in Cyprus